The Best of Hugh Masekela on Novus is an album by South African jazz trumpeter Hugh Masekela. This is a collection of his best tracks recorded for Novus label.

Track listing

References

External links

1999 compilation albums
Hugh Masekela albums